Bella Tromba are an all-female trumpet quartet founded in 2004. The four founding members all studied at the Royal Academy of Music in London.

They regularly appear at the UK's leading music festivals including Cheltenham, Harrogate, and Henley and are particularly active in the commissioning of new works for brass and trumpet quartet.

The group perform on different types of trumpet including bass trumpet, flugel, piccolo, Bflat, C, Eflat and D trumpets.

They are past winners of the Park Lane Group Young Artists award and are currently Selected Artists for Making Music. They performed as Live Music Now artists from 2005-2010.

They regularly appear on BBC Radio 3's In Tune programme with Sean Rafferty, and in 2007 performed and recorded with American rapper and producer Kanye West.

In 2010 they performed at the International Women's Brass Conference in Toronto.

Commissioned works and premieres 

 Berceuse in a Box, 2007. By Paul Whitmarsh. Premiered Pump Rooms, Cheltenham Festival.
 Alveston, 2007. By Howard Skempton. Premiered Purcell Room, London.
 The First Four Trumpets, 2007. By Paul Max Edlin. Premiered Purcell Room, London. 
 Ancient Battlefields, 2007. By Giles Easterbrook. Premiered Purcell Room, London. 
 Booze, Ballads And Bloodshed, 2008. By Ross Brown. Premiered Harrogate International Festival.
 Gestures III, 2008. By Hugo Ribeiro. Premiered Deal Festival.
 There'll never be another you, 2008. By Gavin Broom. Premiered Bichester Jazz Festival.
 Jazz Songs for Trumpets and Vibraphone, 2008. By Gavin Broom. Premiered Harrogate International Festival.
 Colori di Roma', 2009. By Peter Longworth. Premiered Caledonian Club, London.
 El Grito del Silencio, 2010. By Susanne Erding Swiridoff Premiered International Women's Brass Festival, Toronto.
 Blast, 2011. By Bruce Knockles. Premiered Church Stretton and South Shropshire Arts Festival.
 Days of Bells and Flying Creatures, 2017. By Peter Longworth. Premiered Caledonian Club, London.
 Sea Serpents'', 2017. By Peter Yarde Martin. Premiered Brockenhurst Music Society.

Awards 
 Park Lane Group Young Artists
Live Music Now Fellows

Dorothy Parkinson Memorial Prize

Press 
 The Guardian
 The Telegraph
 The Independent
 Metro
 Composition Today 
 4 Bars Rest
 Daily Echo

External links 
 Bella Tromba official website and blog
 Denis Wick UK Artists
 Bella Tromba on YouTube

Alumni of the Royal Academy of Music
Musical groups established in 2004
Musical quartets
Women trumpeters